Bellator 276: Borics vs. Burnell was a mixed martial arts event produced by Bellator MMA that took place on March 12, 2022, at the Family Arena in St. Louis, Missouri, United States.

Background 

The main event featured a Featherweight title eliminator between Ádám Borics and Mads Burnell.

In the co-main event, former Bellator Light Heavyweight Champion and No. 2-ranked Phil Davis returned to action against No. 4-ranked Julius Anglickas, who most recently challenged for the 205-pound title.

One-time Bellator middleweight title challenger John Salter faced Johnny Eblen in a middleweight bout.

A women's featherweight between Cat Zingano and Pam Sorenson was scheduled for the event. However, Zingano was forced to pull out due to injury and the bout was cancelled.

A middleweight bout between Romero Cotton and Lance Wright was scheduled for this event. However, Wright pulled out of the bout due to injury and was replaced by Freddy Sandoval.

A welterweight bout between Derek Anderson and Goiti Yamauchi was scheduled for this event. The week of the event, the bout was scrapped for unknown reasons.

A women's flyweight bout between Diana Avsaragova and Ashley Deen was scheduled for this event. The week of the event, Deen pulled out of the bout and was replaced by Kyra Batara.

At the weigh-ins, Josh Weston missed weight for his bout, weighing in at 175.8 pounds, 4.8 pounds over the welterweight non-title fight limit. Due to the weigh miss, his bout against Josh Augustine was cancelled.

Results

See also 

 2022 in Bellator MMA
 List of Bellator MMA events
 List of current Bellator fighters
 Bellator MMA Rankings

References 

Bellator MMA events
2022 in mixed martial arts
March 2022 sports events in the United States
2022 in sports in Missouri
Mixed martial arts in Missouri
Sports competitions in St. Louis